Bilohorodka (Ukrainian: Білогородка) is a village in Bucha Raion, Kyiv Oblast of north Ukraine. It hosts the administration of Bilohorodka rural hromada, one of the hromadas of Ukraine, formed on 12 June 12 2020 and including nine neighbouring villages: Bobrytsia, Horenytsia, Myzychi, Sviatopetrivske, Hnativka, Stoianka, Shevchenko, Nehrashi, and Luka.

History 

The village was established in 980 as the legendary city-castle Bilhorod Kyivskyi, located in Kyivan Rus'. It was located on the right bank of Irpin River and was mentioned in chronicles.

Until 18 July 2020, Bilohorodka belonged to Kyiv-Sviatoshyn Raion. The raion was abolished that day as part of the administrative reform of Ukraine, which reduced the number of raions of Kyiv Oblast to seven. The area of Kyiv-Sviatoshyn Raion was split between Bucha, Fastiv, and Obukhiv Raions, with Bilohorodka being transferred to Bucha Raion.

Geography 
The village lies at an altitude of 152 metres and covers an area of 5,50 km². It has a population of about 5.868 people (2004).

References 

Villages in Bucha Raion